Plumatyla humerosa is a millipede species found in mines, as well as lava tube and limestone caves of northern California and south-central Oregon. It belongs to the family Conotylidae.  The millipede is likely a troglophile with a white carapace and observed in lava caves though it may inhabit crevices as well. P. humerosa is observed frequenting areas with mold or bat feces on the cave floors. Taracus marchingtoni has been observed feeding on P. humerosa within cave habitat.

See also
Trogloraptor - a cave-dwelling spider of southern Oregon

References

Chordeumatida
Millipedes of North America